The Juba Film Festival provides a platform for young local filmmakers who have the opportunity to interact and share their experiences in the world of diversity and change altogether making a difference in the development of a better and modified South Sudan.

History 
According to Radio Tamazuj news, the film festival founder and Director will be taken for a trip to Germany to see the cinematography of the people there and engage in transforming the current stature in the movie festival in South Sudan. The other participants from 25 other countries will also be part of the exhibition and are to make the necessary changes to their countries of origin.

Origin 
The story of the origin and start of the Juba Film Festival has been recorded and released for the consumption of the various interested parties as it involved a lot of work and connections. According to Eye Radio, the detailed explanation has been displayed for the public.

Funding 
The festival received funding from the Federal Foreign Office which aims at building the connection and making the festival a well established and multiple-attended nationwide program.

References 

Film festivals in Africa
South Sudanese culture